Magnadur is a sintered barium ferrite, specifically BaFe12O19 in an anisotropic form. It is used for making permanent magnets. The material was invented by Mullard and was used initially particularly for focussing rings on cathode ray tubes. Magnadur magnets retain their magnetism well, and are often used in education. Magnadur can also be used in DC motors.

Physical characteristics
 Remanence 0.9 T
 Coercivity 110 kA/m
 Maximum energy product, 20 kJm - at 86 kAm

References

Ferromagnetic materials